This article lists the results and fixtures for the Japan women's national football team.

* Japan score always listed first

2009

2010

2011

2012

2013

2014

2015

2016

2017

2018

2019

2020

2021

2022

See also

Japan
Women's
 International footballers
 National football team (Results)
 National under-20 football team
 National under-17 football team
 National futsal team
Men's
 International footballers
 National football team (Results (2020–present))
 National under-23 football team
 National under-20 football team
 National under-17 football team
 National futsal team
 National under-20 futsal team
 National beach soccer team

References

External links
 List of International matches of Japan, JFA.jp 
 Japan national team 2021 schedule at JFA.jp 

Nat
2015 in Japanese women's football
Nat
2016 in Japanese women's football
 
Results